Trinidad Romero (June 15, 1835 – August 28, 1918) was an American politician and rancher who was the Delegate to United States Congress from the Territory of New Mexico.

Trinidad Romero was born in Santa Fe, Santa Fe County (then a part of the Republic of Mexico), New Mexico, Romero was educated by private tutors.
He engaged in merchandising, freighting with ox teams from Kansas City to Santa Fe, and later in stock raising.
He served as member of the Territorial house of representatives in 1863.
Probate judge of San Miguel County, New Mexico, in 1869 and 1870.

Romero was elected as a Republican to the Forty-fifth Congress (March 4, 1877 – March 3, 1879).
He was not a candidate for renomination in 1878.
He was appointed United States marshal by President Harrison and served from November 13, 1889, to May 30, 1893.
He engaged in mercantile pursuits and stock raising on his ranch near Wagon Mound, New Mexico.
He died in Las Vegas, San Miguel County, New Mexico, August 28, 1918.
He was interred in Calvary Cemetery.

See also
 List of Hispanic Americans in the United States Congress

Sources

1835 births
1918 deaths
Members of the New Mexico Territorial Legislature
Delegates to the United States House of Representatives from New Mexico Territory
American politicians of Mexican descent
United States Marshals
 
Hispanic and Latino American members of the United States Congress
New Mexico Republicans
19th-century American politicians
Politicians from Santa Fe, New Mexico